Ebenezer A. Warner was a Michigan politician.

Warner was born in Connecticut. On November 2, 1858, Warner was elected to the Michigan House of Representatives, where he represented the Chippewa County district from January 5, 1859 to December 31, 1862. During his time in the legislature, he lived in Sault Ste. Marie, Michigan.

References

Year of birth missing
Year of death unknown
People from Connecticut
People from Sault Ste. Marie, Michigan
Members of the Michigan House of Representatives
19th-century American politicians